Mubasshar Hussein (27 December 1943 – 2 January 2023) was a Bangladeshi architect, urban planner and educator. He served as President of Institute of Architects Bangladesh.

Early life and education 
Mubasshar Hussein was born in Wari, Bangladesh on 27 December 1943. He graduated in architecture from Bangladesh University of Engineering and Technology in 1972.

Career
Mubasshar Hussein was the principal architect of Assoconsult Ltd. He was the President of Commonwealth Association of Architects. He also served as the president of Architects Regional Council, Asia ARCASIA.

Personal life and death
Hussein died on 2 January 2023, at the age of 79.

Notable works
 Proshika Bhaban
 Grameen Bank Building

Awards
 AIA President Medal, 2009
 IAB Gold Medal, 2018

References

1943 births
2023 deaths
Bangladeshi architects
Modernist architects
20th-century Bangladeshi architects
21st-century Bangladeshi architects
Bangladesh University of Engineering and Technology alumni
People from Dhaka